Jonathan Shepheard (born 31 March 1981) is a former professional footballer who played in The Football League for Oxford United.

Shepheard's first appearance was in the Football League Trophy on 11 January 2000. This was followed by another appearance in the same competition and two in the Football League by the end of the 1999–2000 season. The following season he played in five games in the league and two in the League Cup; he scored one goal for the club, which was against Wolverhampton Wanderers in a 3–1 defeat in the League Cup.

References

English footballers
Oxford United F.C. players
English Football League players
1981 births
Living people
Association football defenders